Nina Marie Martínez (born San Jose, California) is an American novelist.

Life
She dropped out of high school, but graduated from the University of California at Santa Cruz.

She lived in Northern California.

She lives in Santa Cruz with her daughter.

Awards
 2006 Whiting Award

Works
 "Game:La Lotería De Don Clemente", The Believer, March 2004

References

External links
Profile at The Whiting Foundation
"Nina Marie Martinez", WNYC
"A novel by chance.(Book Review)", The Women's Review of Books, July 1, 2004, Vasquez, Edith M

21st-century American novelists
American women novelists
Living people
21st-century American women writers
Year of birth missing (living people)